Ram Jati Singh, OBE (1908–1992) was a Fiji Indian politician and landlord who was elected to the Legislative Council in the 1966 general elections on the National Federation Party (NFP) ticket. He was re-elected in the 1968 by-election with an increased majority.

He was the father of the Fijian politician Raman Pratap Singh, and the grandfather of Australian politician Lisa Singh.
He had 9 sons and 3 daughters.

Notes and references
 Narendra P. Singh, With the Gods and the Sea, Veran Press, NSW, Australia, 2003, 

1908 births
1992 deaths
Fijian Hindus
National Federation Party politicians
Indian members of the Legislative Council of Fiji
Officers of the Order of the British Empire
Politicians from Bua Province
Fijian landlords
20th-century landowners